The University of Thessaly (UTH;) is a public university in Thessaly, Greece, founded in 1984. The university includes the main campus in the city of Volos and regional campuses located in Karditsa, Larissa, Trikala, and the city of Lamia. The university's central administrative and academic building, located on the seaport seafront, it is often referred to as the main campus, but actually the university does not have a single main site, as it has multi sites with buildings being geographically distributed within the wider region of Volos across the city districts. Enrollment for Fall 2014 consisted of 14,000 undergraduates students, 2,150 master's degree-level students, 1,400 doctoral students, and 710 faculty members.

Emblem 
The emblem of the University of Thessaly is Chiron, who used to live in Pelion Mountain and was famous for his special knowledge about medicine, music, archery, hunting, gymnastics and the art of prophecy.

History
Most university departments were founded by the end of 2001. In 2013, the University of Central Greece (UCG) main campus (2003–2013) in the City of Lamia and its Department of Computer Science and Biomedical Informatics, merged with University of Thessaly. This was followed in 2019 by the Technological Educational Institute of Central Greece (TEICG) main campus (2013–2019) in the City of Lamia and its Departments of Nursing, Physiotherapy, Computer Science, Electronic Engineering, they also are merging with University of Thessaly. Since then these are the existing two sites of the University of Thessaly in the City of Lamia.

Academics
The language of instruction is Greek, although there are programs in foreign languages and courses for international students, which are carried out in English, French, German and Italian. The university includes eight Faculties (shown in the table below), further divided into departments. Each department includes undergraduate and postgraduate degree programmes.

Staff 

The university staff is divided into five main categories:
 Teaching and research staff: The staff in this category undertakes the majority of the teaching and research work done in the university. It comprises professors, associate professors, assistant professors and lecturers.
 Scientific teaching staff: This category consists of former teaching and research assistants. Their main role is to cooperate with the Teaching and Research staff and assist them in their teaching responsibilities.
 Special laboratory teaching staff: The members of this category are administering the university laboratories and they undertake special applied and laboratory teaching work.
 Special technical laboratory staff: They are responsible of keeping the laboratory equipment in good condition and upgrade it whenever necessary in order to stay up to date. They also provide specific technical laboratory services and help with the laboratory teaching.
 Administrative staff: This category comprises all employees working in administrative positions.

The educational work is also exercised by guest professors and scientists who are invited to teach specific courses.

Academic evaluation 
In 2015 the external evaluation committee gave University of Thessaly a Positive evaluation.

An external evaluation of all academic departments in Greek universities was conducted by the Hellenic Quality Assurance and Accreditation Agency (HQA) in the previous years.

University Units

Library and Information Center 

Library and Information Center of University of Thessaly was founded in 1995. Its central building is hosted in the renewed building of the old Athens Bank, which was built in 1903, and is located in the center of Volos. Moreover, there are branches of the Library that operate in every faculty in all cities of University of Thessaly.  The Kitsos Makris Folklore Center is also part of the University of Thessaly Library & Information Center.

Residence Hall 

University of Thessaly owns a small Student Residence Hall in Volos with a capacity of 40 rooms. There is also an accommodation grant of 100 € per month for the undergraduate foreign students of countries outside EU. For the Greek students and also the students of countries members of EU there is an accommodation grant of 1000 € per year depending on academic and financial criteria. There are plans for the development of a new large scale residence hall in the near future.

Psychological Counseling and Support for Students 

The Laboratory of Psychology and Educational Applications of the Department of Special Education offers psychological support and help to all students who need it, in order to deal with their personal difficulties and concerns, and it also helps in developing skills on how to manage potential problems, such as problems in student life, difficulties in personal relations and other psychological disorders.

The students make an appointment with the psychologist of the Laboratory, either individually or in groups; they also may participate in seminars that are organised in regular time intervals. All services are provided free of charge and the meetings have confidential character.

KEDIVIM 
The Centre of Continuing Education and Lifelong Learning (KEDIVIM;) of University of Thessaly is a separate continuing and professional adult educational unit within University of Thessaly, at "non-typical education", although it is fully or partially regulated by the state and lead to officially recognised qualifications being considered non-formal education (NFE). It offers short-term courses on-campus and by Distance e-Learning Mode off-campus mediated via in real time computer-mediated communication, certified by the EOPPEP - National Organization for the Certification of Qualifications and Vocational Guidance. In Greece, adult education, continuing education or lifelong learning is offered to students of all adult ages.

Culture and Sports 

University of Thessaly offers the possibility of many sports and cultural activities. There are many student groups consisting the team of Physical Education, Musical Ensembles, Theater Group, Photography Group etc. In the beginning of every semester the students have the opportunity to enter in every action that are interested in. Moreover, there is plenty of student groups that undertake cultural actions such as Cinema Group and University of Thessaly Student Radio.

Alumni 
Alexis Batrakoulis, MS, CSCS, CSPS, NSCA-CPT, RCPT*E. Founder and Education Director of International Obesity Exercise Training Institute, National Strength and Conditioning Association (NSCA) ERP Sponsor of University of Thessaly, NSCA PTQ Journal Review Panel Member, NSCA PT SIG Executive Council Member, NSCA Membership Commitment Member, 2018 IDEA Personal Trainer of the Year, 2019 IDEA Fitness Innovation Award Recipient, 2020 NSCA Personal Trainer of the Year.

See also 
  Open eClass e-Learning Platform 
 Open eClass Organization Providers Listing 
 List of research institutes in Greece
 List of universities in Greece
 Balkan Universities Network
 Open access in Greece

References

External links 
  
 University of Thessaly Faculties and Departments 
  University of Thessaly Research Committee 
  University of Thessaly DASTA Office (Career Office & Innovation Unit) 
 Greek Research & Technology Network (GRNET) 
  National Authority for Higher Education (NAHE) 
 Hellenic Academic Libraries Link (HEAL–Link) 
 Kallipos (e-books Greek academic publishing) 
 Okeanos (GRNET's cloud service) 

Education in Thessaly
University of Thessaly
Educational institutions established in 1984
Universities and colleges formed by merger in Greece
Volos
Buildings and structures in Thessaly
1984 establishments in Greece